is a Japanese volleyball player who plays for NEC Red Rockets. She also plays for the All-Japan women's volleyball team. She competed at the 2020 Summer Olympics, in Women's volleyball.

Life
Shimamura was born in 1992. She played for the All-Japan team for the first time at the Montreux Volley Masters in May 2013 and in 2016 she played at the 2016 Summer Olympics in Rio de Janeiro.

Shimamura has been the captain of the NEC Red Rockets since the 2015-16 season.

Clubs
  Kamakura Municipal Koshigoe Junior High
  Kawasaki Municipal Tachibana High School
  NEC Red Rockets (2010–)

Awards

Individuals
 2012 - V.Summer League - MVP

Clubs
 2012 - V.Summer League -  Champion, with NEC Red Rockets.
 2015 V.Premier League -  Champion with NEC Red Rockets

National Team

 2017 Asian Women's Volleyball Championship -  Champion

References

External links
 V.League - Profile
 NEC Red Rockets - Profile 

Japanese women's volleyball players
Living people
1992 births
Sportspeople from Kanagawa Prefecture
People from Kamakura
Volleyball players at the 2014 Asian Games
Volleyball players at the 2018 Asian Games
Japan women's international volleyball players
Olympic volleyball players of Japan
Volleyball players at the 2016 Summer Olympics
Volleyball players at the 2020 Summer Olympics
Asian Games competitors for Japan